Langenwang is a small town in the Austrian state of Styria.

Populations

References

Fischbach Alps
Cities and towns in Bruck-Mürzzuschlag District